The England cricket team toured Australia and Ceylon in 1894–95. The team, captained by Andrew Stoddart, played 24 matches in total, of which it won 10, drew 10 and lost 4.  In first-class cricket, the team played 12, won 8 and lost 4.

Five Test matches were played. England won 3–2 after Australia had recovered from 0–2 down to 2–2 with the final match a true decider. The first Test, won by England, was the first of only three Tests in history to be won by a side forced to follow on.

In addition to the Test series, England played first-class matches against the Australian colonial teams: New South Wales, Queensland, South Australia and Victoria.

Test series summary

First Test

Second Test

Third Test

Fourth Test

Fifth Test

Players

England was captained by Andrew Stoddart and had Hylton Philipson as its specialist wicket-keeper, the other players being Johnny Briggs, Bobby Peel, Jack Brown, Tom Richardson, Bill Lockwood, Archie MacLaren, Albert Ward, Bill Brockwell, Francis Ford, Walter Humphreys and Leslie Gay.

Australia was captained in the first Test by Jack Blackham who was also the wicket-keeper.  He was then replaced by George Giffen as captain and by Affie Jarvis as keeper.  Other players to represent Australia were Jack Lyons, Charlie Turner, Harry Trott, Syd Gregory, Joe Darling, Frank Iredale, Ernie Jones, Charlie McLeod, John Reedman, Hugh Trumble, Arthur Coningham, Albert Trott, Jack Worrall, Harry Graham and Tom McKibbin.

Ceylon
The team used Colombo as a stopover during its long sea voyage and played against local sides that were not first-class.  This was the fifth time that an English cricket team had visited Ceylon but it was not until 1911–12 that another arrived.

References

External links
 AE Stoddart's XI in Australia at Cricinfo
 AE Stoddart's XI in Australia 1894–95 at CricketArchive

Further reading
 The Wisden Book of Test Cricket 1877–1978 by Bill Frindall
 My Dear Victorious Stod by David Frith
 Wisden Cricketers Almanack 2006

1894 in Australian cricket
1894 in Ceylon
1894 in English cricket
1895 in Australian cricket
1895 in English cricket
Australian cricket seasons from 1890–91 to 1917–18
Sri Lankan cricket seasons from 1880–81 to 1971–72
1894-95
1894-95
International cricket competitions from 1888–89 to 1918
1894-95